A Time to Sing may refer to:

 A Time to Sing (film), a 1968 film starring Hank Williams Jr. and Shelley Fabares
 A Time to Sing (album), a 1968 album by Hank Williams Jr.